Limit State Design (LSD), also known as  Load And Resistance Factor Design (LRFD), refers to a design method used in structural engineering. A limit state is a condition of a structure beyond which it no longer fulfills the relevant design criteria. The condition may refer to a degree of loading or other actions on the structure, while the criteria refer to structural integrity, fitness for use, durability or other design requirements. A structure designed by LSD is proportioned to sustain all actions likely to occur during its design life, and to remain fit for use, with an appropriate level of reliability for each limit state. Building codes based on LSD implicitly define the appropriate levels of reliability by their prescriptions.

The method of limit state design, developed in the USSR and based on research led by Professor N.S. Streletski, was introduced in USSR building regulations in 1955.

Criteria 
Limit state design requires the structure to satisfy two principal criteria: the ultimate limit state (ULS) and the serviceability limit state (SLS).

Any design process involves a number of assumptions. The loads to which a structure will be subjected must be estimated, sizes of members to check must be chosen and design criteria must be selected. All engineering design criteria have a common goal: that of ensuring a safe structure and ensuring the functionality of the structure.

Ultimate limit state (ULS)
A clear distinction is made between the ultimate state (US) and the ultimate limit state (ULS). The US is a physical situation that involves either excessive deformations leading and approaching collapse of the component under consideration or the structure as a whole, as relevant, or deformations exceeding pre-agreed values. It involves, of course, considerable inelastic (plastic) behavior of the structural scheme and residual deformations. In contrast, the ULS is not a physical situation but rather an agreed computational condition that must be fulfilled, among other additional criteria, in order to comply with the engineering demands for strength and stability under design loads. A structure is deemed to satisfy the ultimate limit state criterion if all factored bending, shear and tensile or compressive stresses are below the factored resistances calculated for the section under consideration. The factored stresses referred to are found by applying Magnification Factors to the loads on the section. Reduction Factors are applied to determine the various factored resistances of the section.

The limit state criteria can also be set in terms of load rather than stress: using this approach the structural element being analysed (i.e. a beam or a column or other load bearing elements, such as walls) is shown to be safe when the "Magnified" loads are less than the relevant "Reduced" resistances.

Complying with the design criteria of the ULS is considered as the minimum requirement (among other additional demands) to provide the proper structural safety.

Serviceability limit state (SLS)
In addition to the ULS check mentioned above, a Service Limit State (SLS) computational check must be performed. To satisfy the serviceability limit state criterion, a structure must remain functional for its intended use subject to routine (everyday) loading, and as such the structure must not cause occupant discomfort under routine conditions. 

As for the ULS, the SLS is not a physical situation but rather a computational check. The aim is to prove that under the action of Characteristic design loads (un-factored), and/or whilst applying certain (un-factored) magnitudes of imposed deformations, settlements, or vibrations, or temperature gradients etc. the structural behavior complies with, and does not exceed, the SLS design criteria values, specified in the relevant standard in force. These criteria involve various stress limits, deformation limits (deflections, rotations and curvature), flexibility (or rigidity) limits, dynamic behavior limits, as well as crack control requirements (crack width) and other arrangements concerned with the durability of the structure and its level of everyday service level and human comfort achieved, and its abilities to fulfill its everyday functions. In view of non-structural issues it might also involve limits applied to acoustics and heat transmission that might also affect the structural design.

This calculation check is performed at a point located at the lower half of the elastic zone, where characteristic (un-factored) actions are applied and the structural behavior is purely elastic.

Factor development
The load and resistance factors are determined using statistics and a pre-selected probability of failure. Variability in the quality of construction, consistency of the construction material are accounted for in the factors. Generally, a factor of unity (one) or less is applied to the resistances of the material, and a factor of unity or greater to the loads. Not often used, but in some load cases a factor may be less than unity due to a reduced probability of the combined loads. These factors can differ significantly for different materials or even between differing grades of the same material. Wood and masonry typically have smaller factors than concrete, which in turn has smaller factors than steel. The factors applied to resistance also account for the degree of scientific confidence in the derivation of the values — i.e. smaller values are used when there isn't much research on the specific type of failure mode). Factors associated with loads are normally independent on the type of material involved, but can be influenced by the type of construction.

In determining the specific magnitude of the factors, more deterministic loads (like dead loads, the weight of the structure and permanent attachments like walls, floor treatments, ceiling finishes) are given lower factors (for example 1.4) than highly variable loads like earthquake, wind, or live (occupancy) loads (1.6). Impact loads are typically given higher factors still (say 2.0) in order to account for both their unpredictable magnitudes and the dynamic nature of the loading vs. the static nature of most models. While arguably not philosophically superior to permissible or allowable stress design, it does have the potential to produce a more consistently designed structure as each element is intended to have the same probability of failure. In practical terms this normally results in a more efficient structure, and as such, it can be argued that LSD is superior from a practical engineering viewpoint.

Example treatment of LSD in building codes
The following is the treatment of LSD found in the National Building Code of Canada:

 NBCC 1995 Format
 φR > αDD + ψ γ {αLL + αQQ + αTT}

 where φ = Resistance Factor
       ψ = Load Combination Factor
       γ = Importance Factor
       αD = Dead Load Factor
       αL = Live Load Factor
       αQ = Earthquake Load Factor
       αT = Thermal Effect (Temperature) Load Factor

Limit state design has replaced the older concept of permissible stress design in most forms of civil engineering. A notable exception is transportation engineering. Even so, new codes are currently being developed for both geotechnical and transportation engineering which are LSD based. As a result, most modern buildings are designed in accordance with a code which is based on limit state theory. For example, in Europe, structures are designed to conform with the Eurocodes: Steel structures are designed in accordance with EN 1993, and reinforced concrete structures to EN 1992. Australia, Canada, China, France, Indonesia, and New Zealand (among many others) utilise limit state theory in the development of their design codes. In the purest sense, it is now considered inappropriate to discuss safety factors when working with LSD, as there are concerns that this may lead to confusion. Previously, it has been shown that the LRFD and ASD can produce significantly different designs of steel gable frames.

There are few situations where ASD produces significantly lighter weight steel gable frame designs. Additionally, it has been shown that in high snow regions, the difference between the methods is more dramatic.

In the United States
The United States has been particularly slow to adopt limit state design (known as Load and Resistance Factor Design in the US). Design codes and standards are issued by diverse organizations, some of which have adopted limit state design, and others have not.

The ACI 318 Building Code Requirements for Structural Concrete uses Limit State design.

The ANSI/AISC 360 Specification for Structural Steel Buildings, the ANSI/AISI S-100 North American Specification for the Design of Cold Formed Steel Structural Members, and The Aluminum Association's Aluminum Design Manual contain two methods of design side by side:  
 Load and Resistance Factor Design (LRFD), a Limit States Design implementation, and
 Allowable Strength Design (ASD), a method where the nominal strength is divided by a safety factor to determine the allowable strength. This allowable strength is required to equal or exceed the required strength for a set of ASD load combinations. ASD is calibrated to give the same structural reliability and component size as the LRFD method with a live to dead load ratio of 3. Consequently, when structures have a live to dead load ratio that differs from 3, ASD produces designs that are either less reliable or less efficient as compared to designs resulting from the LRFD method.

In contrast, the ANSI/AWWA D100 Welded Carbon Steel Tanks for Water Storage and API 650 Welded Tanks for Oil Storage still use allowable stress design.

In Europe
In Europe, the limit state design is enforced by the Eurocodes.

See also
Allowable stress design
Probabilistic design
Seismic performance
Structural engineering

References

Citations

Sources 

 

Structural engineering
Civil engineering